The 2007–08 Ligue 1 season was the seventieth since its establishment, and started in August 2007 and ended on 17 May 2008. The fixtures were announced in June 2007. Lyon became French champions, having won a record seventh consecutive title.

Participating teams

Promotion and relegation 
Lens, Strasbourg and Metz were relegated to Ligue 2. The three relegated teams will be replaced by the three promoted teams from Ligue 2. Le Havre were promoted as Ligue 2 champions along with Nantes, who finished in second place, and third-placed Grenoble.

Stadia

Managers

Kits

League table

Results

Stats

Top goalscorers 
Karim Benzema wins the Trophée du Meilleur Buteur.

Last updated 17 May 2008

Attacking Play table 
Ligue 1 has introduced an Attacking Play Table since the start of the 2006–07 Ligue 1 season to encourage more goal-scoring in Ligue 1 and Ligue 2. The Ligue de Football Professionnel (LFP), with the help of the former France national team manager Michel Hidalgo, introduced the idea to reward those teams who score the most goals. Independent from the official league table, points are awarded as follows:

The sum of 20 million Euros, taken from the LFP's new commercial ventures in 2006/2007 will be dedicated to this initiative. €16.7 million will go to Ligue 1. Prize money is distributed to the teams at the end of the season depending on where they finish in the table.

Last updated 17 May 2008

Pld = Matches played; W = Matches won; W1 = Wins by one goal; W2 = Wins by more than one goal; D = Matches drawn; L = Matches lost; GD = Goal difference; Pts = Points

Player of the Month

Awards

Player of the Year 
The nominees for Ligue 1 Player of the Year. The winner will be displayed in bold.

Young Player of the Year 
The nominees for the Ligue 1 Young Player of the Year. The winner will be displayed in bold.

Team of the Year 

Coach:  Laurent Blanc – Bordeaux

References

External links 
 LFP Official site 
 France 2007/08 at Rec.Sport.Soccer Statistics Foundation

Ligue 1 seasons
France
1